Intralichen is a genus of lichenicolous fungi of uncertain classification in the class Ascomycota. It has four species. The genus was circumscribed by David Leslie Hawksworth and Mariette S. Cole in 2002, with Intralichen christiansenii as the type species.

Species
Intralichen baccisporus 
Intralichen christiansenii 
Intralichen lichenicola 
Intralichen lichenum

References

Ascomycota
Ascomycota genera
Taxa described in 2002
Lichenicolous fungi